Murray Fife Buell (October 5, 1905 – July 3, 1975) was an American ecologist and palynologist.

Personal life
Born in New Haven, Connecticut, Buell earned a B.S. at Cornell University in 1930. He then attended the University of Minnesota, where he earned a M.A. in 1934 and a Ph.D. in 1935. After completing his Ph.D., Buell's studies with W.S. Cooper stimulated his interest in plant ecology.

During graduate school, Buell married Helen Foot (Ph. D., Algology, U. Minn.); the Buells raised two children. Helen was his field companion as well as his wife, and the two worked as a team in research and publication of several papers.

Buell began his professional career at North Carolina State University in 1935, where he started his research on paleoecology of bogs and plant succession.

From 1947 until his retirement in 1971, Buell taught at Rutgers University, where he became professor of botany and served as director of the William Hutcheson Forest. As early as 1955, he and his students studied ecology in relation to land-use management and human impacts, especially in parklands.

In 1962, he served as president of the Ecological Society of America (ESA), and was given the Eminent Ecologist Award by the society in 1970. The Murray F. Buell Award was established by ESA in 1977.

Buell died July 3, 1975, while on a field trip to the New Jersey Pine Barrens.

Career chronology
 1935		Instructor, Assistant Professor, North Carolina State University
 1937–1959 	University of Minnesota Biological Station (summers)
 1946  	Assistant Professor, Rutgers University
 1956–1971	Professor in Botany Department, Rutgers University
 1970		Eminent Ecologist Award by the Ecological Society of America

Selected papers
 Buell, M.F. 1939. Peat formation in the Carolina Bays. Bull. Torrey Bot. Club 66:483–487.
 Buell, M.F. 1945. Late Pleistocene forest of southeastern North Carolina. Torreya 45:117–118.
 Buell, M.F. 1970. Time of origin of New Jersey Pine Barrens bogs. Bull. Torrey Bot. Club 97:105–108.

Bibliography
The following books were written by Murray F. Buell:

 Vegetative Key to the Woody Plants of Itasca State Park, Minnesota (1968), with Robert L. Cain
 Vegetation of New Jersey (1973), with Beryl Robichaud

See also
Cornell University
University of Minnesota
North Carolina State University
Rutgers University
Ecological Society of America
Helen Foot Buell

References

External links
 1970 Eminent Ecologist, ESA website
 President's Biographical Sketch, The Palynological Society (AASP) website
 Resolution of Respect (obituary), ESA website

1905 births
1975 deaths
Cornell University alumni
Rutgers University faculty
University of Minnesota alumni